Kerry Barth Locklin (born September 9, 1959) is an indoor football head coach for the Billings Outlaws of the Champions Indoor Football league (CIF).

Locklin is the son of Billy Ray Locklin, a defensive end who played for the Aggies before spending ten years playing in the Canadian Football League (CFL) with the Montreal Alouettes from 1961 to 1964 and the Hamilton Tiger-Cats from 1965 to 1970. Locklin is the youngest of three brothers. Locklin graduated from Rockdale High School in Rockdale, Texas.

Like his older brother Ray, Locklin graduated from New Mexico State University and played for the Aggies. Locklin was the All-WAC tight end.  Drafted in the sixth round of 1982 NFL Draft by the Los Angeles Rams,  he played with them for the 1982 season and with the Denver Broncos in 1987.  In between, he played with Arizona in the United States Football League from 1984 to 1985.

Locklin coached at Western New Mexico (1988), Utah (1989), Morehead State (1990–1993), for the Shreveport Pirates in the Canadian Football League (1994), and then for Eastern Michigan (1995–1999) and then as the defensive line coach at Fresno State, before joining the Jets.

Locklin agreed to join New Mexico State as their DL Coach for the 2014 Season. In 2022, it was announced that Locklin would take over the head coach job for the Billings Outlaws.

References

External links
 Toronto Argonauts bio

1959 births
Living people
American football tight ends
Arizona Outlaws players
Arizona Wranglers players
Denver Broncos players
Eastern Michigan Eagles football coaches
Florida Tuskers coaches
Fresno State Bulldogs football coaches
Los Angeles Rams players
Morehead State Eagles football coaches
New Mexico State Aggies football coaches
New Mexico State Aggies football players
New York Jets coaches
Sacramento Mountain Lions coaches
San Jose SaberCats coaches
Shreveport Pirates coaches
Utah Utes football coaches
Western New Mexico Mustangs football coaches
Sportspeople from Las Cruces, New Mexico
Players of American football from New Mexico
Toronto Argonauts coaches